Lawrence Lamb(e) may refer to:

Larry Lamb, actor
Lawrence Lambe
Lawrence Lamb (businessman) for CHUM Limited

See also
Larry Lamb (disambiguation)